The Tomb of Ayyub is one of the alleged burial sites of Job. It is located in the hills overlooking the city of Salalah in Oman's Dhofar region. For other such places in Israel, Syria, Lebanon and Turkey, see Local traditions regarding Job.

References

Archaeological sites in Oman
Job (biblical figure)
Jewish pilgrimage sites
Jews and Judaism in Oman
Job